Crystal City is an urban neighborhood in the southeastern corner of Arlington County, Virginia, south of Downtown Washington, D.C. Due to its extensive integration of office buildings and residential high-rise buildings using underground corridors, travel between stores, offices, and residences, it is possible to travel much of neighborhood without going above ground, making at least part of Crystal City an underground city.

Crystal City includes offices of numerous defense contractors, the United States Department of Labor, the United States Marshals Service, satellite offices for The Pentagon, and the headquarters for PBS. It is also the location of Ronald Reagan Washington National Airport.

Geography
Crystal City is centered along a stretch of U.S. Route 1, also known as Richmond Highway, just south of The Pentagon, east of Pentagon City, and within walking distance to the west of Ronald Reagan Washington National Airport. Characterized as one of many urban villages by Arlington County, Crystal City is almost exclusively populated by high-rise apartment buildings, corporate offices, hotels, and numerous shops and restaurants. There is also an extensive network of underground shopping areas and connecting corridors beneath Crystal City.

Crystal City has a station on the Washington Metro's Blue and Yellow Lines, and another on the Virginia Railway Express commuter train system.

Crystal City's layout was considered avant-garde at the time of construction in 1963 with superblocks bounded by arterial and circulating roads and pedestrian traffic and the businesses serving it relocated from the streets to pedestrian tunnels. Crystal City has since been redesigned to give it a more traditional, urban feel, with restaurants at street level, and with traffic patterns changed to make major streets like Crystal Drive function as city street, rather than as circulating roads.

History

20th century

Before Crystal City's development by the Charles E. Smith Company, the area was underutilized with light industrial activity and motels next to National Airport before the age of more consistent business travel. A drive-in theater existed at the intersection of Jefferson Davis Highway and 20th Street South between 1947 and 1963 is visible on aerial photos from this period. Tracks from the Richmond, Fredericksburg & Potomac Railroad were moved closer to National Airport to provide additional room for development.

Though it is not a planned community, Crystal City unfolded in much that fashion after construction began on the first few condominiums and office buildings in 1963. The name "Crystal City" came from the first building, which was called Crystal House and had an elaborate crystal chandelier in the lobby. Every subsequent building initally took on the Crystal name, including Crystal Gateway and Crystal Towers, and others. Crystal City is largely integrated in layout with extensive landscaping with most of its high-rise buildings featuring speckled granite exteriors.

Crystal City's Crystal Underground shopping mall opened in September 1976. Billed as a "turn-of-the-century shopping village," it featured antique leaded glass shop windows and cobblestone "streets." Emphasis was on locally-owned and operated businesses and personalized service. The largest retail outlets were a  Jelleff's women's store, Larimers gourmet grocery and delicatessen, and a Drug Fair. The mall also featured an Antique Alley with small antique and craft stores.

21st century
On June 26, 2004, the Crystal City area underwent a number of changes. Many buildings' addresses were changed on this date, several major roads were turned into two-way streets, and many of the markings for the traditional building names, including Crystal Gateway 1, were removed. As a result, local residents often refer to building names that are difficult for visitors to find.

In 2010, Arlington County developed the Crystal City Sector Plan, which presented the community’s vision to transform Crystal City into a more inviting, lively, and walkable community with more ground-floor retail, better quality office space, and more housing options. This 40-year plan, which won the American Planning Association’s 2013 National Planning Achievement Award for Innovation in Economic Planning and Development, was credited with pioneering the use economic analysis for planning purposes and closely studying the economic impact of demolishing and replacing major commercial buildings.

Economy

Crystal City currently has over 22,000 residents, while around 60,000 come to work there every weekday.

Crystal City is home to the United States Marshals Service and numerous Department of Defense offices. It also has offices of numerous defense contractors, the General Services Administration, and satellite offices for The Pentagon, many of which were built or occupied during the Pentagon Renovation Program. Pentagon offices in Crystal City include the headquarters of the Warrior Transition Command and the Special Inspector General for Afghanistan Reconstruction.

US Airways once maintained its headquarters in the Crystal Park Four building in Crystal City. After US Airways merged with America West Airlines in 2005, the combined company closed the Virginia headquarters and moved the management to Tempe, Arizona, in Greater Phoenix. 

Crystal City currently is home to headquarters for several companies, including Lidl, Lyft, Bloomberg BNA, and others. It also is home to several associations and technology companies, including the Muscular Dystrophy Association, National Waste & Recycling Association, American Diabetes Association, American Public Power Association, PBS, and Consumer Technology Association and others.

On November 13, 2018, Amazon.com announced that Crystal City would be the location of one of two campuses for its Amazon HQ2; the other campus will be located in Long Island City in Queens, New York City. Both campuses are expected to employ approximately 25,000 workers. In Amazon's announcement with Northern Virginia bidders, it announced that its HQ2 neighborhood location would be jointly marketed as "National Landing", which encompasses not only Crystal City but part of Pentagon City and Potomac Yard. In February 2019, Amazon decided to cancel its plans for the Queens location for HQ2 and instead focus exclusively on the Crystal City location, and construction for it is ongoing.

References

Further reading
 
 www.nytimes.com/2016/04/20/realestate/commercial/crystal-city-once-cast-off-by-washington-reboots-itself.html

External links

"Crystal City" at StayArlington.com 

Crystal City
Edge cities in the Baltimore-Washington metropolitan area
Neighborhoods in Arlington County, Virginia
Transit-oriented developments in the United States
Underground cities